Bonaventure Finnbarr Francis Broderick (December 25, 1868 – November 18, 1943) was the Auxiliary Bishop of the Archdiocese of San Cristóbal de la Habana who later ran a gas station for several years until Archbishop (future Cardinal) Francis Spellman restored his ministry, putting him in service in the Archdiocese of New York. Effective December 1, 1939, Spellman assigned the bishop to the chaplaincy of the Frances Schervier Home and Hospital in Riverdale, New York and in 1942 named him Vicar for Religious in the archdiocese.

Early life and education
Bonaventure Broderick was born in Hartford, Connecticut. He was the son of John Harris Broderick and Margaret Healy. Broderick completed his undergraduate seminary studies at St. Charles College in Ellicott City, Maryland. The bishop of the Roman Catholic Diocese of Hartford sent him to the Pontifical Athenaeum S. Apollinare of Propaganda Fide while a seminarian at the North American College. In 1897, Broderick earned his PhD. He also earned a Doctor of Theology at the same university. Under the tutelage of well-known archaeologist Orazio Marucchi, Father Broderick soon became one of the foremost experts on graffiti in the catacombs of Rome. In recognition of his academic accomplishments he became the first American member of The Arcadia, the centuries-old Italian literary society.

Priesthood
On July 25, 1896, Broderick was ordained a priest for the Diocese of Hartford by then Bishop Francesco di Paola Cassetta, who was the Patriarch of Jerusalem and Viceregent of Rome.  Broderick returned to the diocese and was assigned as a pastor in West Hartford, Connecticut. From 1898 to 1900, he was a faculty member at St. Thomas Seminary at Hartford, Connecticut.

When his former Italian instructor, Bishop Donato Sbarretti, was appointed as the ordinary of the Archdiocese of San Cristóbal de la Habana, he appointed Broderick as his secretary. On June 25, 1900, Broderick became the administrator of St. Francis de Sales Church in Cuba. He would later become the administrator of San Carlos and San Ambrosio Seminary. While in Cuba, as secretary to the bishop, Broderick was tasked with settling the question of Church property following the 1898 War with Spain. In recognition of his success in doing so Pope Leo XIII named Broderick a monsignor in 1901. On May 20, 1902, Broderick represented the Catholic Church recognizing the establishment of the Republic of Cuba.

Episcopacy
On September 7, 1903, Broderick was appointed by Pope Pius X as the Auxiliary Bishop of the Archdiocese of San Cristóbal de la Habana and Titular Bishop of Iuliopolis. On October 28, 1903, he was consecrated as the Auxiliary Bishop of San Cristóbal de la Habana. His Principal Consecrator was Archbishop Placide Louis Chapelle with Archbishop Francisco de Paula Barnada y Aguilar as the Principal Co-Consecrator.

Resignation
In the fall of 1904, Archbishop Placide Chapelle, the Apostolic Delegate to Cuba went to Rome to inform the Vatican of rumors that Bishop Broderick was involved in a conspiracy to share in commissions to sell Church property. Broderick followed Chapelle to Rome and successfully defended himself.  Pius X decided that rather than send the bishop back to Cuba, he should go to Washington as an auxiliary bishop to Cardinal Gibbons and manage the Peters Pence Collection throughout the United States. Gibbons objected to the arrangement and the Vatican revoked the assignment. Broderick then wrote a letter to the Holy Father saying in essence that, as a bishop, if he were left without an assignment it might appear as a scandal to some. The pope misunderstood the letter and interpreted it as a threat to cause scandal. As a result of the misunderstanding Broderick was set adrift without an assignment and a one-hundred-dollar per month pension. 

On March 1, 1905, Broderick resigned as Auxiliary Bishop due to a misunderstanding with Pope Pius X and the Vatican over the collection of some funds.

Restoration to episcopal life
On the eve of Spellman's May 23, 1939, consecration as Archbishop, Cardinal Amleto Cicognani, the Apostolic Delegate to the United States, asked Broderick to look into the matter of Broderick's long exile. Within months, while doing some archdiocesan business in Millbrook, New York, Spellman sought out Broderick in Millbrook where, in addition to running the gas station he also wrote a weekly column for the Millbrook Round Table, a local newspaper. The two had a lengthy conversation, the summary of which is found in a wonderful letter written by Spellman to Cicognani and reproduced in Robert Gannon's biography "The Cardinal Spellman Story." Spellman was able to bring an end to the bishop's long exile and effective December 1, 1939 he was made a chaplain of the Frances Schervier Home and Hospital in Riverdale, New York.

In 1942, at the dedication of a new wing to the Schervier facility, Archbishop Spellman, said this: "The greatest thing I have dome for my soul and the greatest gift I have brought to the people of the archdiocese has been in bringing Bishop Broderick to New York." Also, in 1942, Spellman named Bishop Broderick Vicar for Religious in the archdiocese.

Final years and death
On November 18, 1943, Broderick died with the title of Auxiliary Bishop Emeritus of the San Cristóbal de la Habana Archdiocese. His mortal remains are buried in Gate of Heaven Cemetery, Hawthorne, New York in the Sisters of St. Francis plot.

References

1868 births
1943 deaths
20th-century American Roman Catholic titular bishops
St. Charles College alumni
20th-century Roman Catholic bishops in Cuba
Roman Catholic bishops of Havana